Padmaragam is a 1975 Indian Malayalam-language film,  directed by  J. Sasikumar and produced by V. M. Chandi. The film stars Prem Nazir, Jayabharathi, Kaviyoor Ponnamma and Adoor Bhasi. The film has musical score by M. K. Arjunan.

Cast 

Prem Nazir
Jayabharathi
Kaviyoor Ponnamma
Adoor Bhasi
Thikkurissy Sukumaran Nair
Sreelatha Namboothiri
T. R. Omana
Bahadoor
K. P. Ummer

Soundtrack 
The music was composed by M. K. Arjunan with lyrics by Sreekumaran Thampi.

References

External links 
 

1975 films
1970s Malayalam-language films
Films directed by J. Sasikumar